Priyanshu Chatterjee (born 20 February 1973) is an Indian actor and former model known for his works in Bollywood, and Bengali cinema. He made his Hindi film debut in the box-office big success Tum Bin in 2001. His other recognized work includes Aapko Pehle Bhi Kahin Dekha Hai,  Dil Ka Rishta, Pinjar, Bhootnath, Hate Story 3, Baadshaho and Shikara.

Career
Priyanshu Chatterjee started his modelling career working with projects such as Digjam's Print Campaign, Wills Cigarettes, Levi's and Four Square. Following this, he appeared in a Udit Narayan music video . Chatterjee made his acting debut with Tum Bin (2001), a romantic drama. Bollywood Hungama while reviewing Tum Bin, wrote of Chatterjee's performance "Priyanshu has the meatier role and he performs it with utmost sincerity."  After the success of Tum Bin, the director of the film, Anubhav Sinha, decided to cast Priyanshu Chatterjee in his next project, which was Aapko Pehle Bhi Kahin Dekha Hai, co-starring Sakshi Shivanand, Om Puri and Farida Jalal. In the same year, he starred in two more films; Dil Ka Rishta, co-starring Aishwarya Rai and the other film being Pinjar, which once again starred Sandali Sinha. In 2004, he starred in two unsuccessful films; Woh, and Madhoshi. In 2008, he got a small role in the multi-starrer Bhoothnath, where he played the son of Bhoothnath, portrayed by Amitabh Bachchan. In 2015, he was seen in a cameo in Hate Story 3.

Filmography

Web series

References

External links
 

1973 births
Male actors in Hindi cinema
Indian male film actors
Indian male models
Living people
Male actors from West Bengal
Male actors in Bengali cinema
21st-century Indian male actors
Male actors from Delhi